Borys Michał Szyc-Michalak (born Borys Michalak; 4 September 1978) is a Polish film and theatre actor and musician.

Life and career
He was born in Łódź, Poland. He graduated from High School No. 26 in Łódź. In 2001, he graduated from Warsaw-based Aleksander Zelwerowicz State Theatre Academy and started a successful film and theatre career. Since 2001, he has performed at Teatr Współczesny in Warsaw. In 2007, he was awarded the Wiktor, the prize of the public Polish Television (TVP), for the best Polish TV actor.

He achieved nationwide popularity by starring in such films as Vinci (2004), Testosteron (2007), Mole (2011), The Secret of Westerplatte (2013), Persona Non Grata (2015), Spoor (2017) and Cold War (2018). Apart from his film career he appeared in numerous popular TV series including For Better or Worse, Honey Years, Foster Family, Kasia i Tomek and Niania.

In 2008 he recorded a single "Choć wieje, pada, grzmi" with Justyna Steczkowska. In November the same year he recorded his debut studio album Feelin' Good released by EMI Music Poland with guest appearances by Ewa Bem, Kasia Cerekwicka, Marysia Starosta and Justyna Steczkowska.

In 2011, he recorded a song "Śpiewka" (composed by Krzesimir Dębski) together with Natasza Urbańska which was used in the film Battle of Warsaw 1920 directed by Jerzy Hoffman.

Personal life
He was in a relationship with Anna Bareja with whom he has a daughter Sonia. In 2008 he was banned from driving for two years by a court ruling for drunk driving. In 2019, he married Justyna Szyc-Nagłowska with whom he has a son Henryk born in 2020.

Discography

Studio albums

Music videos

Filmography

Actor
 Enduro bojz (2000) as Motorcyclist
 Stacja (2001) as Tomek
 The Spring to Come (2001) as Wojciech Buławnik
 E=mc² (2002) as Student
 Magiczne drzewo (2004, TV series)
 Symmetry (2004) as Albert
 Vinci (2004) as Julian
 The Welts (2004) as Bartosz
 Oficer (2005) as Tomasz ‘Kruszon’ Kruszyński
 Chaos (2006) as Łysy
 Janek (2006)
 Droga wewnętrzna (2006)
 Oficerowie (2006) as Tomasz ‘Kruszon’ Kruszon
 Job, czyli ostatnia szara komórka (2006) as Chemist
 South by North (2006) as Jakub
 Hyena (2006) as Kid's father, Iceman, Bryndza's son
 Ryś (2007) as Policeman
 Tajemnica twierdzy szyfrów (2007) as Untersturmführer Matheas Beer
 Testosterone (2007) as Tytus
 Lejdis (2008)
 Grom (2008)
 And a Warm Heart (2008)
 Snow White and Russian Red (2008) as Jobbo
 Trzeci oficer (2008) as Tomasz ‘Kruszon’ Kruszyński
 The Mole (2011)
 Battle of Warsaw 1920 (2011) as Jan Krynicki
 Criminal Empire for Dummy's (2013) as Skinhead
 Tajemnica Westerplatte (2013) as Lieut. Stefan Grodecki
 Persona Non Grata(2015) as Pesh
 Spoor (2017)
 Kamerdyner (2018) as Fryderyk von Krauss
 Cold War (2018) as Lech Kaczmarek
 Mowa Ptaków (2019)
 Piłsudski (2019) as Józef Piłsudski

Polish dubbing
 Gnomeo & Juliet (2011) as Tybalt
 George the Hedgehog (2011) as George the Hedgehog
 Contact High (2009) as Schorsch
 Esterhazy (2009) as Ewa's father
 The True Story of Puss'N Boots (2009) as Puss in Boots
 Assassin's Creed (2008)  as Malik Al-Saif
 Bolt (2008) as Bolt
 Asterix at the Olympic Games (2008) as Brutus
 Go West: A Lucky Luke Adventure (2007) as Joe Dalton
 Donkey Xote (2007) as Rocinante
 TMNT (2007) as Raphael
 Broken Sword: The Angel of Death (2006) as George Stobbart
 Home on the Range (2004)
 The Bard's Tale (2004) as Bard
 Spy Kids 3-D: Game Over (2003) as Raz
 Chicago 1930 (2003) as Edward Nash
 8 Mile (2002) as Jimmy 'Rabbit' Smith Jr
 Dragon Ball Z: Fusion Reborn (1995) as Vegeta
 Dragon Ball Z: Wrath of the Dragon (1995) as Vegeta

Theatrical roles 
 Bambini di Praga (2001, directed by Agnieszka Glińska, Teatr Współczesny in Warsaw)
 Wniebowstąpienie – Tadeusz Konwicki (2002, directed by Maciej Englert, Teatr Współczesny in Warsaw)
 Stracone zachody miłości – William Shakespeare (2003, directed by Agnieszka Glińska, Teatr Współczesny in Warsaw)
 Pułkownik Ptak [The Colonel Bird] – Hristo Boychev (2003, directed by Piotr Nowak)
 Dobry wieczór kawalerski – Dorota Truskolaska (directed by Jerzy Bończak)
 Porucznik z Inishmore – Martin McDonagh (2003, directed by Maciej Englert, Teatr Współczesny in Warsaw)
 Nieznajome z Sekwany [Die Unbekannte aus der Seine] – Ödön von Horváth (2004, directed by Agnieszka Glińska, Teatr Współczesny in Warsaw)
 Transfer (2005, directed by Maciej Englert, Teatr Współczesny in Warsaw)
 Udając ofiarę [Playing the Victim] – Oleg and Vadimir Presnyakov (2006, directed by Maciej Englert, Teatr Współczesny in Warsaw)
 Proces – Franz Kafka (2008, directed by Maciej Englert, Teatr Współczesny in Warsaw)

References

External links 
 

1978 births
Actors from Łódź
Living people
Polish male actors
Polish film actors
Polish male stage actors
Polish male television actors
Polish television actors
Polish male voice actors
Polish pop singers
21st-century Polish male singers
21st-century Polish singers
Aleksander Zelwerowicz National Academy of Dramatic Art in Warsaw alumni